Maria Luisa Mangini (2 February 1928 – 15 February 2011), better known as Dorian Gray, was an Italian actress.

Biography 
Gray made her stage debut in 1950. After five years she left the world of the theater and devoted herself to cinema.

The role she played most often in films was that of a seductive sex kitten. She played the titular "bad girl" in Totò, Peppino e la malafemmina. She also appeared in Michelangelo Antonioni's Il grido. In 1957, she took part in The Nights of Cabiria by Federico Fellini.

Death
On February 15, 2011, Gray committed suicide by gunshot at her home in Torcegno. She was 83 years old; some media, however, reported her age as 75, since she herself claimed to have been born in 1936.

Partial filmography

Accidenti alle tasse!! (1951) - Margot
 The Reluctant Magician (1951)
Amo un assassino (1951) - Vandina
Anema e core (1951) - Amica di Cocciaglia
 Sardinian Vendetta (1952) - Columba Porchiddu
The Queen of Sheba (1952) - Ati
 Poppy (1952) - La guardarobiera
Io piaccio (1955) - Doriana Paris
Totò lascia o raddoppia? (1956) - Ellen
Totò, Peppino e la malafemmina (1956) - Marisa Florian (the 'malafemmina')
Guaglione (1956) - Nadia Lanti
Totò, Peppino e i fuorilegge (1956) - Valeria
Le notti di Cabiria (1957) - Jessy
Il grido (1957) - Virginia
Domenica è sempre domenica (1958) - Luciana
Mogli pericolose (1958) - Ornella
Racconti d'estate (1958) - Dorina
Vacanze d'inverno (1959) - Carol Field
Brevi amori a Palma di Majorca (1959) - Hélène
Le sorprese dell'amore (1959) - Desdemona aka Didì
Il Mattatore (1960) - Elena
La regina delle Amazzoni (1960) - Antiope
Crimen (1960) - Eleonora Franzetti
Il carro armato dell'8 settembre (1960)
Mani in alto (1961) - Pupina Micacci
Gli attendenti (1961) - Lauretta
 (1962) - Marie-Louise Jörgensen
Peccati d'estate (1962) - Irene
The Legion's Last Patrol (1962) - Nora
Avventura al motel (1963)
Thrilling (1965) - Veronique (segment "Sadik")
I criminali della metropoli (1967) - Denise (final film role)

References

External links

 

1936 births
2011 suicides
Italian film actresses
Actors from Bolzano
Suicides by firearm in Italy
Nastro d'Argento winners
20th-century Italian actresses
2011 deaths